Miguel Ángel Castellini (26 January 1947 – 28 October 2020) was an Argentine professional boxer. Castellini, who was active as a professional from 1965 to 1980, is most notable for having held the WBA and lineal light middleweight titles from 1976 to 1977. 

He died from COVID-19 during the COVID-19 pandemic in Argentina.

Professional career
Castellini began his professional career on 28 May 1965, in San Miguel de Tucumán against Domingo Gerez. Castellini scored a second round knockout over Gerez to record his first win. He remained undefeated over his first thirteen fights before suffering his first loss to Hermogenes Quintela. Quintela knocked Castellini out in the tenth round of their fight on 9 September 1966.

On 4 November 1972 Castellini won his first championship by beating Hector Ricardo Palleres to claim the Argentine light middleweight title. Castellini fought for the first time outside of his native Argentina on 25 May 1974, he travelled to Monaco to beat Carlos Alberto Salinas. During his career Castellini also fought in Italy, Puerto Rico, Denmark, Nicaragua, and Spain.

It was while in Spain that Castellini challenged for the WBA and lineal light middleweight titles, then held by Jose Manuel Duran, in front of a sell out crowd of 12,000. Duran, who was making the first defence of his title, was knocked down in the third round by a left hand to the jaw. Although the champion rose from the canvas, he was outworked by the faster challenger and lost his title via a split decision in a fight where both boxers finished with bloody faces.

Castellini's championship reign only lasted one fight as he lost it in his first defence to Eddie Gazo on 5 March 1977. Gazo, fighting in his hometown of Managua, Nicaragua, defeated Castellini via unanimous decision with scores of: 144–149, 144–148, and 143–148. This defeat was avenged, however, in a non-title bout on 20 September 1980. On this occasion Gazo travelled to Argentina to take on Castellini. Castellini won the fight by knockout in the ninth round in what was to be his final professional fight.

Professional boxing record

See also
List of world light-middleweight boxing champions

References

External links

Miguel Angel Castellini - The Cyber Boxing Zone Encyclopedia

 

1947 births
2020 deaths
Argentine male boxers
People from Santa Rosa, La Pampa
Argentine people of Italian descent
Light-middleweight boxers
The Ring (magazine) champions
World Boxing Association champions
World light-middleweight boxing champions
Deaths from the COVID-19 pandemic in Argentina